Yujiulü Futu (pinyin: Yùjiǔlǘ Fútú ) (died 508) was khagan of the Rouran (506–508) with the title of Tuohan Khagan (佗汗可汗) or Tahan Khagan (他汗可汗). He was the first son of Yujiulü Nagai.

Reign 
In 506, he succeeded his father as khagan of the Rouran. His first act was to send Hexi Wuiliba (紇奚勿六跋), a Rouran envoy to Northern Wei emperor Xuanwu in order to make peace. However, emperor ordered the ministers to convey to the ambassador that the Rouran are descendants of slaves, the former emperors only communicated with them out of mercy and the Rouran will soon lose their lands. Again in 507, Futu sent the emperor a letter and sable fur. The emperor replied that peace with Northern Wei could be earned by fighting the Gaoche. However, this war proved disastrous as in 508 he was killed in battle by the Gaoche ruler Mi'etu (彌俄突). He was succeeded by his son Yujiulü Chounu same year.

Family 
He had at least seven children:

 Yujiulü Chounu
 Yujiulü Qinifa (郁久閭俟匿伐)
 Yujiulü Anagui
 Yujiulü Zuhui (郁久閭祖惠)
 Yujiulü Yijufa (郁久閭乙居伐)
 Yujiulü Tahan (郁久閭塔寒) - married to Princess Huazheng (化政公主), daughter of a Northern Wei official Yuan Yi (元翌)
 Yujiulü Tutujia (郁久閭秃突佳)

References

Sources 

History of the Northern Dynasties, vol. 86.
Book of Wei, vol. 103
Zhizhi Tongjian, vol. 159.

 

508 deaths
Khagans of the Rouran
Military personnel killed in action
Year of birth unknown